Vernonia lettermannii, the narrowleaf ironweed, is a plant species known only from Arkansas and Oklahoma.

Flower heads are purple, arranged as a corymb.

References

lettermannii
Flora of Arkansas
Flora of Oklahoma
Flora without expected TNC conservation status